
Gmina Brodnica is a rural gmina (administrative district) in Brodnica County, Kuyavian-Pomeranian Voivodeship, in north-central Poland. Its seat is the town of Brodnica, although the town is not part of the territory of the gmina.

Villages
Gmina Brodnica contains the villages and settlements of Cielęta, Gorczenica, Gorczeniczka, Gortatowo, Karbowo, Kominy, Kozi Róg, Kruszynki, Moczadła, Niewierz, Nowy Dwór, Opalenica, Podgórz, Sobiesierzno, Szabda, Szczuka, Szymkowo and Wybudowanie Michałowo.

Neighbouring gminas
Gmina Brodnica is bordered by the town of Brodnica and by the gminas of Bartniczka, Bobrowo, Brzozie, Osiek, Świedziebnia, Wąpielsk and Zbiczno.

References

Polish official population figures 2006

Brodnica
Gmina Brodnica